Ira Sullivan is an eponymous album by multi-instrumentalist Ira Sullivan which was recorded in 1977 and released on the Flying Fish label.

Reception

The AllMusic review by Scott Yanow stated "The talented multi-instrumentalist Ira Sullivan made a rare return to Chicago for this set, ... Switching between trumpet, flugelhorn, soprano and flute, Sullivan performs a couple of originals and four standards ... This is a more straight-ahead than usual program of music by the adventurous improviser".

Track listing
 "The Girl from Ipanema" (Antônio Carlos Jobim, Vinícius de Moraes, Norman Gimbel) – 8:45
 "Monday's Dance"  (Ira Sullivan) – 6:04
 "Circumstantial" (Simon Salz) – 9:44
 "Stranger in Paradise" (Robert Wright, George Forrest, Alexander Borodin) – 8:30
 "Angel Eyes" (Matt Dennis, Earl Brent) – 8:07
 "That's Earl, Brother"  (Dizzy Gillespie) – 8:04

Personnel
Ira Sullivan – flute, soprano saxophone, trumpet, flugelhorn
Jodie Christian – piano
Simon Salz – guitar
Dan Shapera– bass
Wilbur Campbell – drums

References

Flying Fish Records albums
Ira Sullivan albums
1978 albums